Dendropsophus columbianus (common name: Boettger's Colombian treefrog) is a species of frog in the family Hylidae.
It is endemic to the Andes of Colombia.
Dendropsophus columbianus is a common and adaptable species that lives in disturbed areas that formerly supported cloud forests; it has not been found in closed forests. It is typically associated with open habitats, especially those with some waterbodies (small lakes, reservoirs, grassy marshes or pools, wetlands).

References

columbianus
Amphibians of Colombia
Endemic fauna of Colombia
Amphibians described in 1892
Taxonomy articles created by Polbot